Rhabdophis bindi, the Bindee keelback, is a keelback snake in the family Colubridae found in India and Bangladesh.

References

Rhabdophis
Reptiles of India
Reptiles of Bangladesh
Reptiles described in 2021